The following is a list of New Zealand actors.

A
 Courtney Abbot (born 1989) – actress
 Andy Anderson (born 1947) – actor
 Michelle Ang (born 1983) – actress
 KJ Apa (born 1997) – actor

B
 Tim Balme (born 1967) – actor and screenwriter
 Kylie Bax (born 1975) – model and actress
 Zoë Bell (born 1978) – stuntwoman and actress
 Manu Bennett (born 1969) – actor
 Ken Blackburn (born 1935) – actor
 Angela Bloomfield (born 1972) – actress
 Helen Brew (1922–2013) – actress
 Jaquie Brown – actress

C
 Dwayne Cameron (born 1981) – actor
 Keisha Castle-Hughes (born 1990) – Academy Award-nominated actress
 Milo Cawthorne (born 1989) – actor
 Lisa Chappell (born 1968) – actress
 John Clarke  (1948–2017) – actor, comedian (moved to Australia)
 Jemaine Clement (born 1974) – half of the comedy duo Flight of the Conchords
 Danielle Cormack (born 1970) – actress
 Shane Cortese (born 1968) – actor
 Russell Crowe (born 1964) – actor and singer
 Marton Csokas (born 1966) – actor
 Cliff Curtis (born 1964) – actor

D
 Alan Dale (born 1947) – actor
 Rhys Darby (born 1974) – actor and comedian
 Mana Hira Davis – stunt man
 Tammy Davis – actor

E
 Peter Elliott – actor
 Pat Evison (1924–2010) – actress
 Barbara Ewing (born 1939) – actress

F
 David Fane (born 1966) – actor and comedian
 Deb Filler (born 1954) – actress
 Kerry Fox (born 1966) – actress

G
 Jon Gadsby (1953–2015) – actor
 Rebecca Gibney (born 1964) – actress
 Daniel Gillies (born 1976) – actor

H
 Mark Hadlow (born 1957) – actor
 Kate Harcourt (born 1927) – actress
 Miranda Harcourt (born 1962) – actress
 Lisa Harrow (born 1943) – actress
 George Henare (born 1945) – actor
 Martin Henderson (born 1974) – actor
 Bruce Hopkins (born 1955) – actor, voice artist, TV presenter, MC, Action Actors founder; Lord Of The Rings
 Rachel House (born 1971) – actress
 Rachel Hunter (born 1969) – model
 Michael Hurst (born 1957) – British born Actor director and writer Hercules: The Legendary Journeys and companion series Xena: Warrior Princess
 Anna Hutchison (born 1986) – actress

J

 Billy T. James (1948–1991) – comedian, actor
 Erana James (born 1999) – actress
 Sabby Jey (born 1993) – Sri Lankan Tamil actress
 Anna Jullienne (born 1982) – actress

K
 Wi Kuki Kaa (1938–2006) – actor
 Simone Kessell (born 1975) – actress
 Oscar Kightley (born 1969) – actor (born in Apia, Samoa)
 Charles Knight, aka Tankboy (born 1967) – actor and live stunt performer

L
 Peter Land (born 1953) – West End and Broadway actor, singer
 Lucy Lawless (born 1968) – actress, Xena: Warrior Princess, Spartacus: Blood and Sand
 Bruno Lawrence (1941–1995) – actor and musician with band Blerta (born in England)
 Nathaniel Lees (born 1972) – actor
 John Leigh (born 1965) – actor
 Melanie Lynskey (born 1977) – Hollywood actress

M
 Robyn Malcolm (born 1965) – actress
 James Henry Marriott (1799–1886) – actor (born in England, arrived in New Zealand 1843)
 Sally Martin (born 1985) – actress
 Rose McIver (born 1988) – actress
 Bret McKenzie (born 1976) – half of the comedy duo Flight of the Conchords
 Thomasin Harcourt McKenzie (born 2000) – actress
 David McPhail (1945–2021) – actor
 Michael Miles (1919–1971) – game show host
 Temuera Morrison (born 1960) – actor
 Ian Mune (born 1941) – actor, director, screenwriter

N
 Marshall Napier (1951–2022) – actor
 Jessica Napier (born 1979) – actress
 Sam Neill (born 1947) – actor (born in Northern Ireland, raised in New Zealand)

O
 Dean O'Gorman (born 1976) – actor
 Rena Owen (born 1962) – actress
 Stefania LaVie Owen (born 1997) – actress (born in Miami, Florida; New-Zealand-American)

P
 Anna Paquin (born 1982) – actress (born in Canada, raised in New Zealand)
 Rawiri Paratene – actor
 Craig Parker (born 1970) – actor, Shortland Street, Legend of the Seeker, Spartacus: Blood and Sand
 Nyree Dawn Porter (1936–2001) – actress
 Simon Prast (born 1962) – actor
 Antonia Prebble (born 1984) – actress

R
 Chris Rankin (born 1983) – actor
 Greer Robson (born 1971) – actress
 Ilona Rodgers (born 1942) – actress
 James Rolleston (born 1997) – actor
 Caleb Ross (born 1981) – actor
 Paolo Rotondo (born 1971) – Italian-born actor
 Alison Routledge (born 1960) – actress
 Jay Ryan (born 1981) – actor Beauty & the Beast

S
 Madeleine Sami (born 1980) – actress
 Brian Sergent (born 1959) – actor
 Emmett Skilton (born 1987) – actor
 Kerry Smith (1953–2011) – actress
 Kevin Smith (1963–2002) – actor
 Miriama Smith (born 1976) – actress
 Ewen Solon (1917–1985) – actor
 Antony Starr (born 1975) – actor, Banshee, Outrageous Fortune, Rush, Tricky Business
 Alyssa Stringfellow (born 1985) – actress, musician, model
 Matthew Sunderland (born c. 1972) – actor

T
 Olivia Tennet (born 1991) – actress
 Beryl Te Wiata (1925–2017) – actress, author, scriptwriter
 Inia Te Wiata (1915–1971) – opera singer, actor, carver
 Rima Te Wiata (born 1963) – actress
 Joel Tobeck (born 1971) – actor, Tangle, The Doctor Blake Mysteries, Xena Warrior Princess, Hercules: The Legendary Journeys, Young Hercules, Sons of Anarchy, 1 & 2, Ash vs Evil Dead, One Lane Bridge
 Selwyn Toogood (1916–2001) – actor and game show host
 John Tui (born 1975) – actor
 Lani Tupu (born 1955) – actor
 Jared Turner (born 1978) – actor

U
 Karl Urban (born 1972) – actor

W
 Taika Waititi (born 1975) – actor, director, comedian
 Matt Whelan (born 1985) – actor
 Davina Whitehouse (1912–2002) – actress (born in the UK)
 Annie Whittle – actress and singer
 Brooke Williams (born 1984) – actress
 Laura Wilson (born 1983) – actress
 Katie Wolfe (born 1968) – actress

X
 Mika X (born 1962) – actor, director, comedian

References

New Zealand
Actors
 
Actors